Patibandla. Chandrasekhara Rao (22 April 1936 – 11 October 2018) was an Indian jurist. He was from Veerullapadu Village Guntur-Krishna District region of coastal Andhra Pradesh of what was then called Madras Presidency.

From October 1996 until 2017 he was a judge at the International Tribunal for the Law of the Sea (ITLOS). He was the president of ITLOS from 1999 to 2002. He was also an honorary visiting professor at Damodaram Sanjivayya National Law University, Visakhapatnam.

Studies
Rao graduated from the University of Madras in two subjects, with a double bachelors in Arts as well as Law. Thereafter he did further studies, on completion of which he was awarded a Masters in Law and subsequently a doctorate.

Career
Chandrasekhara Rao initially worked as a researcher for the Indian Society of International Law from 1963-67. He then joined the Ministry of External Affairs (India) where he worked as a Law Officer (1967–1971) and subsequently Assistant Legal Adviser (1971–1976) in the Legal and Treaties Division. During this time, he acted as counsel for the Government of India in the case concerning an Appeal relating to the Jurisdiction of the ICAO (India v. Pakistan) before the International Court of Justice in 1972.

Thereafter Rao was appointed Legal Adviser to the Permanent Mission of India at the United Nations (New York City) from 1972–1976. He continued to hold high level posts in the Indian government's Ministry of Justice, including Deputy Legislative Counsel, Additional Legal Adviser, Joint Secretary and Legal Adviser, Additional Secretary (1976–1988), Secretary (1988–1996), Union Ministry of Law and Sole Arbitrator in Government contracts (1979–1983). He was the Secretary-General of the International Center for Alternative Dispute Resolution, New Delhi (1995–1996).

Since 1 October 1996, Rao has been a judge at the International Tribunal for the Law of the Sea.

Rao has also been a visiting professor from 1994 to 1995 at Osmania University, Hyderabad; Kakatiya University (Warangal) and University of Madras in 1995-96. From 1994 to 2000 he was president of the Indian Society of International Law.

Awards
Rao was awarded the Padma Bhushan by the Government of India on 25 January 2012 for his contribution to the area of public affairs.

Books
Rao has authored several books on International law including
 The New Law of Maritime Zones, 1982
 The Indian Constitution and International Law, 1993
 The Arbitration and Conciliation Act, 1996: A Commentary, 1997
 Alternative Dispute Resolution: What it means and how it works (ed.), 1996
 The International Tribunal for the Law of the Sea: Law and Practice (co-ed.), 2000
 The Rules of the International Tribunal for the Law of the Sea: A Commentary (co-ed.), 2006

References

External links
 ITLOS - Judge P. Chandrasekhara Rao Biography at the website of the ITLOS
  Press release from the Press Information Bureau — Govt of India
 http://www.newindianexpress.com/cities/hyderabad/2018/oct/12/eminent-jurist-patibandla-chandrasekhara-rao-passes-away-in-hyderabad-1884380.html

20th-century Indian judges
1936 births
2018 deaths
International Tribunal for the Law of the Sea judges
Recipients of the Padma Bhushan in public affairs
Indian judges of United Nations courts and tribunals
People from Guntur district
People from Krishna district